Image Comics is an American comic book publisher. These are the ongoing and limited series publications it has released under its own brand and imprints such as Todd McFarlane Productions, Desperado Publishing, Beckett Comics, and Top Cow Productions.

Titles

0–9
 10th Muse (2000–2001; issues 1–9)
 13 Chambers (2008; by mink and Denis Medri)
 The 13th Artifact (2016; by Amit Chauhan)
 1963 (1993)
 1st Man (1997; one-shot)
 21 (1996)
 24Seven (2006–2007; anthology, edited by Ivan Brandon)
 3 Floyds: Alpha King (2015; by Brian Azzarello and Nick Floyd)
 39 Minutes (2016; by William Harms)
 4-Fisted Adventures of Tug and Buster (1998; one-shot)
 40 Oz. Collected TPB (1998; one-shot)
 50 Girls 50 (2001; 4-issue mini-series)
 '68 (2006, 2011 by Mark Kidwell, Nat Jones and Jay Fotos)
 76 (2008–2009; 5-issue mini-series)
 86 Volta Dead Girl (2005; one-shot)
 8house (2016; by Brandon Graham)

A
 A.D.: After Death (2017)
 The Activity (2012-2014)
 Adrenalynn: Weapon of War (1999–2000)
 Adrift (2015)
 Adventures in the Rifle Brigade (2000)
 Afar (2017)
 Age of Bronze (1998–2010)
 Airboy (2016)
 Alex + Ada (2013–2015)
 Alien Pig Farm 3000 (2007; by writer Todd Farmer/Steve Niles/Thomas Jane and art by Donald Marquez)
 Allegra (1996)
 All Against All (2022-Present) - Will medias Spiritual Successor to Others Titles.
 Alley Cat (1999–2000)
 The Alliance (1995)
 Alpha Girl (2012)
 Alter Nation (2004)
 Altered Image (1998)
 The Amazing Joy Buzzards (2005)
 The Amazing Joy Buzzards vol. 2 (2005–2006)
 Amber Atoms (2009)
 American Flagg (2013)
 American Jesus (2009)
 American Legends (2014)
 The Amory Wars (2007–2008)
 The Amory Wars vol. 2 (2008)
 Analog (2018-2020)
 Angela (1994–1995)
 Ant vol. 2 (2005–2007; previous volume from Arcana Studio)
 Aqua Leung (2008; by Mark Andrew Smith and Paul Maybury)
 Arcanum (1997–1998)
 Area 52 (2001)
 Aria (1999)
 Ascend (2004; by Keith Arem and Christopher Shy;;; reprinted as Special Edition by IDW Publishing)
 Assassin Nation (2019)
 The Astounding Wolf-Man (2007–2010)
 Astro City (1995–1996; by Kurt Busiek)
 Astro City vol. 2 (1996–2000)
 The Atheist (2005–2007)
 Athena Inc. (2001)
 The Autumnlands (2015-2017)
 Awakening (1997–1998)

B
 Back to Brooklyn (2008-2009)
 Backlash (1994-1997)
 Bad Dog (2009-2014)
 Bad Ideas (2004)
 Bad Planet (2005-2008)
 Badger (1997-1998)
 Badrock and Company (1994-1995)
 Badrock (1995-1996)
 Bastard Samurai (2002)
 Battle Chasers (1998-2001)
 Battle Hymn (2004–2005)
 Battle of the Planets (2002-2003)
 Battle of the Planets: Coup de Gras (2005)
 Battle Pope vol. 2 (2005–2007; previous volume from Funk-o-Tron)
 Battlestar Galactica
 Battlestone (1994)
 The Beauty (2015–)
 Bedlam (2012–2014)
 Beef (February 2018 – June 2018; five-issue miniseries)
 Berserker (2009-2010)
 Beyond Avalon (2005)
 Big Bang Comics (1996-2001; previous volume from Caliber Comics)
 Big Bruisers (1996; one-shot)
 Big Hair Productions (2000)
 Bingo Love
 Birthright (2014–2021)
 Bitch Planet (2014–)
 Bitter Root (2018–)
 Black and White (1994; 3-issue mini-series)
 Black & White (1996, one-shot)
 Black Cloud (2017-2018)
 Black Flag (1994; one-shot)
 The Black Forest (2004; one-shot)
 Black Magick (2015–)
 Black Mist (2007, 2-issue mini-series, reprint of the Caliber Comics series)
 Black Monday Murders (2016–)
 Black Ops (1996, 5-issue mini-series)
 Black Road (2016-2017)
 Black Science (2013–2019)
 Black Tide (2001-2002)
 Blacklight (2005)
 Blair Witch: Dark Testaments (2000; one-shot)
 Blindside (1996; one-shot)
 Bliss Alley (1997)
 Blood Legacy (2000)
 Blood Legacy: The Young Ones (2003; one-shot)
 Blood River (2005)
 Blood Stain (2016-2017)
 Bloodhunter (1996; one-shot)
 Bloodpool (1995; 4-issue mini-series)
 Bloodstream (2004; 4-issue mini-series)
 Bloodstrike (1993-1994; 2012)
 Bloodwulf (1995)
 Blue (1999-2000)
 Body Bags(2005)
 Bodycount (1996; 4-issue mini-series)
 Bohos (1998)
 Bolero (2022)
 Bomb Queen
 Bonds (2007-2009)
 Bone (1996-1999)
 Bonerest (2005–2006)
 Boof (1994)
 Boof and the Bruise Crew (1994)
 Book of Shadows (2006)
 Brass (1996-1997; 2000-2001)
 Brawl (2007)
 Brigade (1992-1995)
 Brit (2007–2009)
 Broken Trinity (2008)
 Brother Bedlam (2006; one-shot)
 Bulletproof Coffin (2010)
 Bulletproof Coffin: Disinterred (2012)
 Bulletproof Monk (1998–1999)
 Bunker
 Burglar Bill vol. 2 (2004–2005)
 Butcher Knight (2000-2001; 4-issue mini-series)

C
 C-23 (1998; 9-issue series)
 Carbon Grey (2011–present)
 Casanova (2006–2008)
 Celestine (1996; 2-issue mini-series)
 Channel Zero (1998; 5-issue mini-series)
 Chapel (1995-1996; 2-issue mini-series followed by 7-issue series)
 Chassis (1999-2000; 5-issue mini-series; previous volumes from Millennium Publications and Hurricane Comics)
 Chew (2009-2016)
 Choker (2010-2012)
 Cholly and Flytrap (2004-2005; 4-issue mini-series)
 The Circle (2007-2008)
 City of Heroes vol. 2 (2005–2007; previous volume from Blue King Studios)
 City of Silence (2000; 3-issue mini-series)
 The Clock Maker (2003; 4-issue mini-series)
 Cloudburst (2004; OGN)
 Codeflesh (2009; one-shot)
 Comic Book Tattoo (2008; anthology)
 Compass Zero
 Copperhead (2014–2018)
 The Creech (1997)
 Creed
 Crimson (1998-2001)
 The Cross Bronx (2006)
 Crossover (2020-)
 Crosswind (2017–2018; 6-issue mini-series)
 The Crow (1999)
 Crowded (2018–)
 Crypt (1995; 2-issue mini-series)
 Curse Words (2017–2019)
 Cursed (2003-2004; 4-issue mini-series)
 Clementine (2022)
 Cyberforce
 Cybernary (1995-1996; 5-issue mini-series)
 Cyberpunx (1996; one-shot)

D
 Damned (1997; 4-issue mini-series)
 Danger Girl (1998-2011; further volumes published by IDW Publishing)
 Darkchylde (1996-1998)
 Darker Image (1993; one-shot)
 Darkminds (2000-2001)
 Dart (1996; 3-issue mini-series)
 David and Goliath (2003-2004; 3-issue mini-series)
 Dawn: Three Tiers (2003-2005; 6-issue mini-series; previous volumes published by Sirius Entertainment)
 Days Of Hate (2018; 12-issue maxi-series) 
 Dead Ahead(2008-2010; 3-issue mini-series)
Dead Body Road (2013-2014; 6-issue mini-series)
 Dead Body Road: Bad Blood (2020; 6-issue mini-series)
 The Dead Lucky (2022-)
 Dead Space (2008; 6-issue mini-series)
 Deadly Class (2013–)
 Deadworld vol. 3 (2005–2006; previous volumes from Caliber Press)
 Death Dealer (2007-2008; 6-issue mini-series)
 Death Jr. (2005; 3-issue mini-series)
 Death Jr. Vol. 2 (2006; 3-issue mini-series)
 Death or Glory (2018–2020, by Rick Remender and Bengal)
 Deathblow (1993-1996)
 Deathblow Vol. 2 (2006-2008; published by Wildstorm Comics)
 Demonslayer (1998–2000)
 Deep Sleeper (2004; 4-issue mini-series, first two issues originally published by Oni Press)
 Defcon 4 (1996; 4-issue mini-series)
 Defiance (2002-2003)
 Deity: Revelations (1999; 4-issue mini-series)
 Descender (2015–2018)
 Ascender (2019-)
 Desperate Times (1998; 4-issue mini-series)
 Desperate Times (2004; 2-issue mini-series)
 The Detonator (2004–2005; by Mike Baron)
 Die (2018–2021)
 A Distant Soil (1996-; Reprints of Aria Press material for issues 1-14; new material from issue 15)
 Divine Right (1997-1999)
 Doom's IV (1994)
 Drain (2006-2008)
 Drifter (2014–2017)
 The Drowned (2004; graphic novel)
 Drums (2011; 4-issue mini-series)
 Dust (2007; 2-issue mini-series)
 Dust Wars (2010; 3-issue mini-series)
 Dusty Star (1997; 2-issue mini-series)
 DV8 (1996-1999)
 Dynamo 5 (2007–2009)

E
 East of West (2013–2019)
 Eclipse (2017–2019)
 Elephantmen (2006–2018)
 Elsewhere (2017–2018)
 Empty Zone (2015-2016)
 Enormous (2012; one-shot; continued, 2022, 2023 by 215 Ink Publishing)
 Eternal Empire (2017–2018)
 The Expatriate (2005–2006)
 Extreme Sacrifice (1995)
 Extremity (2017–2018)

F
 Faction Paradox (2003; 2-issue mini-series)
 The Fade Out (2014–2016)
Fairlady (2019; 5-issue mini-series)
 Fall Out Toy Works (2009–2010)
 Family Tree (2020-)
Farmhand, by Taylor Wells and Rob Guillory (2018–)
 Fatale (2012-2014)
 Fear Agent (2005–2010)
 Fearless (2007-2008; 4-issue mini-series)
 Feather (2003-2004; 5-issue mini-series)
 Fell (2005–2008)
 Ferro City (2005)
 Fire From Heaven (1996)
 Fire Power (2020-)
 Firebreather (2003; 4-issue mini-series)
 Firebreather Vol. 2 (2008-2009; 4-issue mini-series)
 Firebug (2018)
 Five Ghosts (2013–2015)
 The Fix (2016–2018)
 Flaming Carrot Comics (2004–2005)
 Flavor (2018; 6-issue mini-series)
 Forever Amber (1999; 4-issue mini-series)
 Four Eyes (2008-2010)
 Four Eyes: Hearts of Fire (2016)
 Four Letter Worlds (2005; anthology)
 Frankenstein Mobster (2003-2004)
 Freedom Force (2005; 6-issue mini-series)
 Freshmen (2005–2006)
 From Under Mountains (2015-2016; 6-issue mini-series)

G
 G.I. Joe
 G-Man
 Gear Station
 Geeksville
 Gen¹³
 Gen¹³/Monkeyman and O'Brien
 Get Naked (Great was Utopian Nudist Comic)
 Ghost Spy
 Ghosted 
 The Gift (2004–2006; previously published by Raven Publications)
 Girls (2005–2007)
 Gladstone's School for World Conquerors
 Glitter Bomb (2016–2017)
 Glitter Bomb: The Fame Game (2017–2018)
 Go Girl!
 God Complex (2009–2010)
 God Country (2017)
 God Hates Astronauts (2014–2015)
 Gødland (2005-2012)
 The Gray Area
 Grease Monkey
 Great Pacific
 Green Valley (2016–2017)
 Groo the Wanderer
 Grounded (2005–2006)
 Grrl Scouts: Work Sucks
 Guerillas
 GunCandy (2005–2006)

H
 Hack/Slash
 Halcyon
 Happy! (see Grant Morrison bibliography#Other US publishers)
 Haunt
 Hawaiian Dick
 Hawaiian Dick: The Last Resort (2004–2005)
 Hazed
 Heirs of Eternity
 Hellcop
 Hellshock
 Hellspawn
 Hero Camp (2005)
 Hip Flask
 Home (2021; 5-issue mini-series)
 Hong on the Range
 Horizon (2016–)
 The Horror Book
 Humankind
 The Humans (2015) – a spiritual successor to the Planet of the Apes comic series
 Hunter-Killer (2005–2007)

I
 I Hate Fairyland
 I Hate this Place
 I Kill Giants
 Ice Cream Man (2018-)
 Image+ (2016-2018)
 Image! (2022-)
 The Imaginaries (2005)
 Immortal II
 Infidel
 Infinite Dark
 Intimidators (comics)
 Intrigue
 Invincible (2003–2018)
 Invisible Republic (2015–)
 The Iron Ghost (2005–2006)
 Iron Wings
 Isis (2002; one-shot)

J
 Jack Kirby's Silver Star
 Jack Staff (2003–2009)
 Jade Warriors (1999), #1–3
 Jersey Gods
 Jinx
 Journeyman
 J.U.D.G.E.
 Jupiter's Legacy (Volume 1, 2015; Volume 2, 2017)

K
 Kabuki
 Karmen (2021)
 Kid Supreme
 Kill All Parents
 Kill the Minotaur (2017–)
 Kill or Be Killed (2016–2018)
 Kin
 Kingdom City
 Kiss: Psycho Circus
 Knightmare
 Kore

L
 Lady Pendragon
 Lady Rawhide
 The Last Christmas
 Last Shot
 Lazarus (2013-)
 Leave It to Chance
 Legacy
 Legend of Supreme
 Liberty Meadows (2002–2006)
 The Light (2010)
 The Li'l Depressed Boy
 Limbo (2015–2016)
 Lions, Tigers and Bears
 Liquid City
 Little Bird (2019)
 Little Monsters (2022-)
 Little Red Hot
 Loaded Bible
 Lovesick (2022-)
 Low
 Lucha Libre
 Lullaby: Wisdom Seeker

M
 M. Rex
 Madman Atomic Comics (beginning April 2007)
 Maestros (2017–)
 Mage
 The Magic Order
 Man-Eaters by Chelsea Cain and Kate Niemczyk
 The Manhattan Projects
 Manifest Destiny (2013–)
 Mask of Zorro
 Masters of the Universe
 Maximage
 The Maxx
 Mayhem!
 Mech Destroyer
 Megaton Man
 Meltdown
 The Mice Templar
 Micronauts
 Middlewest (2018–)
 Misplaced
 Monkey Meat (2022)
 Monstress by Marjorie Liu and Sana Takeda (2015–)
 Moonstruck by Grace Ellis and Shae Beagle (2017–)
 Mora (2005)
 More Than Mortal: Otherworlds
 Morning Glories
 Motor Crush (2016–)
 Murder Falcon (2018-)
 Mutant Earth
 Mythstalkers

N
 Nailbiter
 Nash (1999)
 Near Death (2011)
 The New Brighton Archeological Society (2009)
 New Masters (2022)
 New Men
 The Next Issue Project
 Night Club
 Night World (2014; 10-issue miniseries)
 No Place Like Home
 Noble Causes (2002)
 Noble Causes (vol. 2 2004–2009)
 Nonplayer
 Nowhere Men
 NYC Mech
 NYC Mech: Beta Love (2005)

O
 Obergeist
 Oblivion Song
 Occult Crimes Taskforce
 Oliver (2019–)
 Olympus
 Orc Stain
 Ordinary Gods (2021-)
 The Others
 Outcast
 Outlaw Territory

P
 Paper Girls (2015–2019)
 Paradigm (September 2002 – November 2003)
 Pax Romana (December 2007 – November 2008)
 Peter Panzerfaust (February 2013 – December 2016)
 Phantom Guard
 Phantom Jack
 Phonogram (August 2006 – January 2016)
 PigTale
 The Pirates of Coney Island
 PITT
 Planetoid
 Point of Impact
 Popgun (October 2012 – January 2013)
 The Portent Post Americana (2021) as spiritual successor to Crossed and others.
 Power Rangers: Zeo Powers (April 2000–)
 Pretty Deadly (2013–)
 Prism Stalker (2018–)
 The Private Eye (March 2013–)
 Prodigy Proof (October 2007 – 2010)
 Prophet PvP vol. 2 (2003–2010)

Q

R
 Radiant Black (2021-)
 Radiant Red (2022)Rain Like Hammers (2021)
 Random Acts of Violence (2010)
 Rasputin  (2014–2016)
 Rat Queens (2013)
 The Realm (2017–)
 Redlands (2017–)
 Redneck (2017–)
 Reed Gunther (2011)
 Regulators (1995)
 Renato Jones (2017)
 Repo (2007)
 Revenge (2014)
 Revival (2013–2017)
 Rex Mundi (2002–2006)
 Riptide Rising Stars: Voices of the Dead (2005)
 Rocketo: Journey to the Hidden Sea (2005–2006)
 Rose (2017–)
 Rotogin: Junkbotz Rogue Sun (2022-)
 Rumble (2014–)
 Runes of RagnanS
 The Safest Place Saga Satellite Sam Savage Dragon Savant Garde Screamland Scud: The Disposable Assassin Sea of Red (2005–2006)
 Sea of Stars (2019–)
 Season of the Witch (2005–2006)
 The Second Stage Turbine Blade Seven to Eternity (2016-)
 Severed Sex Criminals (2013–2020)
 Shadowhawk Shadows Shaman's Tears Ship of Fools Shutter Sidekick Sins of the Black Flamingo Siren Skullkickers Skyward (2018–)
 Sleepless Slots (2017–)
 Small Gods (2004–2005)
 Snotgirl (2016–)
 SOCOM: SEAL Team Seven Sonata (2019–)
 Sons of the devil Sorrow Soul Kiss Southern Bastards (2014–)
 Southern Cross (2015–)
 Spawn Spread (2014–)
 Stardust Kid (2005)
 Stellar (2018–)
 Stillwater by Zdarsky & Pérez (2020-)
 Stone Stormwatch The Strange Adventures of H.P. Lovecraft (2009)
 Strange Girl (2005–2007)
 The Strange Talent of Luther Strode (2011–2012)
 Strangers Stray Bullets (1995–)
 Stray Dogs (2021)
 Stupid Comics Suburban Glamour Sullivan's Sluggers Super Dinosaur Supermassive 
 SuperPatriot Supreme Sweets The Sword Sword of Dracula Sylvia Faust (2004–2005)

T
 Team 7 Teen Wolf Teenage Mutant Ninja Turtles Tellos Tellos: Second Coming (2005)
 The Tenth Tenth Muse Texas Strangers They're Not Like Us (2014-; written by Eric Stephenson, art by Simon Gane, & colors by Jordie Bellaire)
 Thief of Thieves (2012)
 Throwaways (2016)
 Tomb Raider Total Eclipse One Shot (1998)
 A Touch of Silver Transhuman Trees (2015)
 Trencher Tribe The Tripper Troubleman (1996; miniseries 1–3)
 True Story, Swear to God TurfU
 Ultra Ultramega (2021)
 Umbra Underground Undying Love (2011)
 Union Unnatural by Mirka Andolfo (2018–2019)

V
 Vanguard (1993–1994)
 Velocity Velvet (2013–2016)
 V.I.C.E. (2005–2006)
 Victory (2003–2004)
 Victory vol. 2 (2004–2005)
 Viking (2009–2010)
 Violent Messiahs A Voice in the Dark VoltronW
 Wahoo Morris (2000; one-shot)
 The Walking Dead (2003–2019)
 Wanted (2003-2005; 6-issue mini-series)
 War Heroes (2008-2009; 3-issue mini-series; 6 issues planned originally)
 Ward of the State (2007; 3-issue mini-series)
 Warlands (1999-2001)
 The Warning (2018–2019)
 Waterloo Sunset (2004–2005)
 Wayward (2014-2018)
 We Stand On Guard (2015; 6-issue mini-series)
 Weapon Zero 
 Wetworks Whispers (2012–2013; 6-issue mini-series)
 The Wicked + The Divine (2014–2019)
 The Wicked West (2 graphic novels)
 Wildcats Wildguard WildStar: Sky Zero (1993; 4-issue mini-series)
 Wildstar (1995-1996; 3-issue mini-series)
 Wildstorm! (1995; 4-issue mini-series)
 Witch Doctor (2011; 5-issue mini-series)
 Wonderlost (2007-2008; 2-issue mini-series)
 Wytches by Scott Snyder and Jock (2014-2015; 6-issue mini-series)

X
 XXXombies (2007; 4-issue mini-series)

Y
 YoungbloodZ
 Zero (2013-2015)

Graphic novels
 Black Cherry (by Doug TenNapel, July 2007)
 Blue in Green (by Ram V and Anand RK, October 2020)
 Devoid of Life (by Raffaele Ienco, September 2008)
 Displaced Persons (by Derek McCulloch and Anthony Peruzzo, August 2014)
 Douglas Fredericks and the House of They (with Joe Kelly and Ben Roman, December 2008)
 Earthboy Jacobus (by Doug TenNapel, 2005)
 The Five Fists of Science (by Matt Fraction and Steven Sanders, 2006)
 Flight (2004; comics anthology currently running to 7 volumes)
 Four-Letter Worlds (March 2005)
 Gear (by Doug TenNapel, 1999)
 Hector Plasm: De Mortuis (by Benito Cereno and illustrated by Nate Bellegarde, June 2006)
 Iron West (by Doug TenNapel, July 2006)
 Inferno Girl Red (by Mat Groom and Erica D'urso, 2022)
 Long Hot Summer (by Eric Stephenson with art by Jamie McKelvie, October 2005)
 Popgun (edited by Mark Andrew Smith and Joe Keatinge, 2007; comics anthology currently running to 4 volumes)
 Pug (by Derek McCulloch and Greg Espinoza, July 2010, 2010)
 Stagger Lee (by Derek McCulloch and Shepherd Hendrix, May 2006)
 Tales From the Bully Pulpit (by Benito Cereno and illustrated by Graeme MacDonald, August 2004)
 Tommysaurus Rex (by Doug TenNapel, August 2004)
 The Wizard's TaleBeckett Comics

Desperado Publishing

Extreme Studios
 Avengelyne (1996)
 Badrock (1995–1996)
 Badrock and Company (1994–1995)
 Bloodstrike (1993–1995)
 Brigade vol. 2 (1993–1995)
 Brigade vol. 3 (2010)
 Glory (1995–1996)
 Prophet (1993–1995)
 Prophet vol. 2 (1995–1996)
 Supreme (1992–1996)
 Team Youngblood (1993–1996)
 Youngblood (1992–1994)
 Youngblood vol. 2 (1995–1996)
 Youngblood Strikefile (1993–1995)

Gorilla Comics

Highbrow Entertainment
 Dart (1996)
 Deadly Duo (1994–1995)
 Deadly Duo vol. 2 (1995)
 The Dragon (1996) 
 Dragon: Blood & Guts (1995) 
 Freak Force (1993–1995)
 Freak Force vol. 2 (1997)
 Savage Dragon (1992)
 Savage Dragon vol. 2 (1993–)
 Savage Dragon: God War (2004–2005)
 Savage Dragon/Marshal Law (1997) 
 Savage Dragon: Red Horizon (1997) 
 Savage Dragon: Sex and Violence (1997) 
 Star (1995)
 SuperPatriot (1993)
 SuperPatriot: America's Fighting Force (2002)
 SuperPatriot: Liberty & Justice (1995)
 SuperPatriot: War on Terror (2004–2005)
 Teenage Mutant Ninja Turtles Vol. 3 (1996–1999)
 Vanguard (1993–1994)
 Vanguard: Strange Visitors (1996–1997)

Shadowline

Todd McFarlane Productions
 The Adventures of Spawn (2007–2008)
 Angela (1994–1995)
 Angela & Aria Angela & Glory Celestine The Creech (1997)
 The Creech: Out for Blood (2001)
 Curse of the Spawn (1996–1999)
 Cy-Gor (1999) 
 Daring Escapes (1998–1999)
 Gunslinger Spawn (2021-present)
 Haunt (2009–2012)
 Hellspawn (2000–2003)
 King Spawn (2021-)
 Kiss: Psycho Circus (1997–2000)
 Medieval Spawn / Witchblade (1996)
 Medieval Spawn / Witchblade (2018)
 Misery Sam & Twitch (1999–2004)
 Case Files: Sam & Twitch (2003–2006)
 Sam & Twitch: The Writer (2010)
 Sam & Twitch: True Detectives Savior (2015) 
 Spawn: Fan Edition Spawn: Simony Spawn: Blood and Salvation Spawn: Architects of Fear Spawn: Resurrection Spawn: Blood and Shadows (1999) Spawn; Toy comics Shadows of Spawn (2005–2006)
 Spawn (1992-)
 Spawn: Blood Feud (1995) 
 Spawn: The Dark Ages (1999–2001) 
 Spawn: Godslayer (2007–2008)
 Spawn: The Impaler (1996) 
 Spawn: The Undead (1999–2000) 
 Spawn Kills Everyone (2016-2019)
 Spawn Universe #1 (2021)
 Spawn: Unwanted violence (2023)
 The Scorched (2021-)
 Todd Mcfarlane Presents: The Crow (1999)
 Violator (1994)
 Violator vs BadrockTop Cow Productions

 Codename: Strykeforce (1994–1995)
 Cyberforce (1993–1997)
 Cyberforce vol. 2 (2006)
 Impaler (2006–2007)
 Impaler vol. 2 (2008–2010)
 Think Tank (2012)
 Witchblade'' (1995–2015)

Wildstorm Productions

References

External links

Image Comics at the Big Comic Book DataBase

 
Image Comics